Salvia tubiflora is a perennial native to a small area of western Peru and northern Chile near the tropic of Capricorn, growing at elevations from  to .

The undersides have prominent veins with tiny hairs arranged in rows. The  flowers are long, straight and tube shaped, which explains the specific epithet tubiflora. The  calyx is an unusual reddish green color and covered with small hairs and glands.

Notes

Flora of Chile
Flora of Peru
Plants described in 1790
tubiflora